USS Palomas (IX-91) was a two-masted, steel-hulled, Miscellaneous Unclassified-Schooner in service with the United States Navy. She served during World War II, and briefly after the war. She was sold for disposal by the Maritime Commission in 1947. 

Built as the schooner yacht Goodwill by the Bethlehem Shipbuilding Corp. in 1922, she was acquired by the U.S. Navy on  12 September 1942, and placed into service on 2 October 1942 as the Miscellaneous Unclassified-Schooner Palomas.

History
Operating from San Diego, California, Palomas steamed along the southern California coast in a training capacity. A unit of the Western Sea Frontier, Palomas protected the southern California area guarding Allied and friendly shipping, and operated in a patrol capacity. She was assigned as a unit of ServRon 2 on 19 October 1943 and continued west coast operations with this unit until the war's end in 1945. 

After the cessation of hostilities, Palomas served as a radar training ship, serving out of Naval Station Treasure Island. She then reported to San Francisco for disposal on 1 June 1946. She was placed out of naval service on 10 August 1946, struck from the Naval Register on 25 September 1946, and transferred to the Maritime Commission for disposal on 3 March 1947.

Fate
After sale to Ralph E. Larrabee in 1951 for $35,000, her name was changed to Goodwill as she returned to civilian service. Larrabee, spent a total of $500,000 to restore her to civilian condition. She was already a famous vessel among boat racers and yacht owners. She made a name for herself, being one of the largest civilian yachts on the Pacific Ocean, and winning the TransPacific Race in both 1953 and 1959. She also made two Atlantic crossings sometime before or after her military service.

Sinking
On 25 May 1969, Goodwill ran aground on Sacramento Reef. Goodwill was reported overdue on 31 May, after she was supposed to arrive at Ensenada on 27 May. A joint search effort began with the United States Coast Guard and the Mexican Navy. On 1 July, her wreck was spotted half-careened on the reef, submerged under  of water by a search helicopter. The search continued until 6 June, when a private salvage crew arrived. Two bodies of the nine aboard were recovered. By 10 June, powerful surges and tides had battered the yacht's hull, and gutted the interior; the ship was rapidly breaking up. Though investigation of the incident had continued, salvage, like the ship, was abandoned.

Ship Awards
During her U.S. Navy service, Palomas earned the following decorations:
American Campaign Medal
World War II Victory Medal

References

External links
NavSource, USS Palomas, IX-92
Hyperwar, USS Palomas

Ships of the United States Navy
Schooners of the United States Navy
1922 ships